Catharanthus is a genus of flowering plants in the family Apocynaceae. Like the genus Vinca, they are known commonly as periwinkles. There are eight known species. Seven are endemic to Madagascar, though one, C. roseus, is widely naturalized around the world. The eighth species, C. pusillus, is native to India and Sri Lanka. The name Catharanthus comes from the Greek for "pure flower".

These are perennial herbs with oppositely or almost oppositely arranged leaves. Flowers are usually solitary in the leaf axils. Each has a calyx with five long, narrow lobes and a corolla with a tubular throat and five lobes.

Catharanthus roseus, known formerly as Vinca rosea, is a main source of vinca alkaloids, now sometimes called catharanthus alkaloids. The plant produces about 130 of these compounds, including vinblastine and vincristine, two drugs used to treat cancer.

Catharanthus roseus is also cultivated as an ornamental plant in gardens. Several cultivars have been bred to produce flowers in many shades of pink, red, lilac, and white, or in light shades with dark throats.

Species
 Catharanthus coriaceus Markgr. – Madagascar
 Catharanthus lanceus (Bojer ex A.DC.) Pichon – Madagascar
 Catharanthus longifolius (Pichon) Pichon – Madagascar
 Catharanthus ovalis Markgr. – Madagascar
 Catharanthus pusillus (Murray) G.Don. – India, Sri Lanka, Western Himalayas
 Catharanthus roseus (L.) G.Don. – Madagascar periwinkle, old-maid, rosy periwinkle, pink periwinkle – Madagascar; naturalized in Italy, S Asia, Australia, S United States, Central America, India and various oceanic islands
 Catharanthus scitulus (Pichon) Pichon – Madagascar
 Catharanthus trichophyllus (Baker) Pichon  – Madagascar. It is also known as Sadabahar or Baramasi in India.

References

External links 
 

 
Apocynaceae genera